The Rainbow Kid is a 2015 Canadian drama film directed by Kire Paputts. It was shown in the Discovery section of the 2015 Toronto International Film Festival.

The film, an expansion of Paputts' prior short film Rainbow Connection, stars Dylan Harman as Eugene, a teenage boy with Down syndrome who sees a rainbow following a thunderstorm and, inspired by his favourite book, sets off on a journey to find the pot of gold at the end of it.

Cast
 Dylan Harman as Eugene
 Krystal Nausbaum as Anna
 Nicholas Campbell as Bill
 Julian Richings as Elvis Grimes

References

External links
 
 

2015 films
2015 drama films
Canadian drama films
English-language Canadian films
Films directed by Kire Paputts
2010s English-language films
2010s Canadian films